In vector calculus, Green's theorem relates a line integral around a simple closed curve  to a double integral over the plane region  bounded by . It is the two-dimensional special case of Stokes' theorem.

Theorem

where the path of integration along  is anticlockwise.

In physics, Green's theorem finds many applications. One is solving two-dimensional flow integrals, stating that the sum of fluid outflowing from a volume is equal to the total outflow summed about an enclosing area. In plane geometry, and in particular, area surveying, Green's theorem can be used to determine the area and centroid of plane figures solely by integrating over the perimeter.

Proof when D is a simple region

The following is a proof of half of the theorem for the simplified area D, a type I region where C1 and C3 are curves connected by vertical lines (possibly of zero length). A similar proof exists for the other half of the theorem when D is a type II region where C2 and C4 are curves connected by horizontal lines (again, possibly of zero length). Putting these two parts together, the theorem is thus proven for regions of type III (defined as regions which are both type I and type II). The general case can then be deduced from this special case by decomposing D into a set of type III regions.

If it can be shown that

and

Green's theorem then follows for regions of type III.

Assume region D is a type I region and can thus be characterized, as pictured on the right, by

Compute the double integral in :

C can be rewritten as the union of four curves: C1, C2, C3, C4.

With C1, use the parametric equations: x = x, y = g1(x), a ≤ x ≤ b. Then

With C3, use the parametric equations: x = x, y = g2(x), a ≤ x ≤ b. Then

The integral over C3 is negated because it goes in the negative direction from b to a, as C is oriented positively (anticlockwise). On C2 and C4, x remains constant, meaning

Therefore,

Putting the two together, we get the result for regions of type III.

Proof for rectifiable Jordan curves 
We are going to prove the following

We need the following lemmas whose proofs can be found in:

Now we are in position to prove the theorem:

Proof of Theorem. Let  be an arbitrary positive real number. For this , consider the decomposition given by the previous Lemma. We have

Put .

For each , the curve  is a positively oriented square, for which Green's formula holds. Hence

Thus, if  is the union of all border regions, then ; hence , by Lemma 2. Notice that

This yields

We may as well choose  so that the RHS of the last inequality is 

We have

By Lemma 1(iii),

Combining these, we finally get

Since this is true for every , we are done.

Validity under different hypotheses 
The hypothesis of the last theorem are not the only ones under which Green's formula is true. Another common set of conditions is the following:

The functions  are still assumed to be continuous.

As a corollary of this, we get the Cauchy Integral Theorem for rectifiable Jordan curves:

Multiply-connected regions 
Theorem. Let  be positively oriented rectifiable Jordan curves in  satisfying

Let

If the function

Relationship to Stokes' theorem
Green's theorem is a special case of the Kelvin–Stokes theorem, when applied to a region in the -plane.

We can augment the two-dimensional field into a three-dimensional field with a z component that is always 0. Write F for the vector-valued function . Start with the left side of Green's theorem:

The Kelvin–Stokes theorem:

The surface  is just the region in the plane , with the unit normal  defined (by convention) to have a positive z component in order to match the "positive orientation" definitions for both theorems.

The expression inside the integral becomes

Thus we get the right side of Green's theorem

Green's theorem is also a straightforward result of the general Stokes' theorem using differential forms and exterior derivatives:

Relationship to the divergence theorem
Considering only two-dimensional vector fields, Green's theorem is equivalent to the two-dimensional version of the divergence theorem:

To see this, consider the unit normal  in the right side of the equation. Since in Green's theorem  is a vector pointing tangential along the curve, and the curve C is the positively oriented (i.e. anticlockwise) curve along the boundary, an outward normal would be a vector which points 90° to the right of this; one choice would be . The length of this vector is  So 

Start with the left side of Green's theorem:

Area calculation
Green's theorem can be used to compute area by line integral. The area of a planar region  is given by

Choose  and  such that , the area is given by

Possible formulas for the area of  include

History 
It is named after George Green, who stated a similar result in an 1828 paper titled An Essay on the Application of Mathematical Analysis to the Theories of Electricity and Magnetism. In 1846, Augustin-Louis Cauchy published a paper stating Green's theorem as the penultimate sentence. This is in fact the first printed version of Green's theorem in the form appearing in modern textbooks. Bernhard Riemann gave the first proof of Green's theorem in his doctoral dissertation on the theory of functions of a complex variable.

See also

Method of image charges – A method used in electrostatics that takes advantage of the uniqueness theorem (derived from Green's theorem)
Shoelace formula – A special case of Green's theorem for simple polygons

References

Further reading

External links
Green's Theorem on MathWorld

Theorems in calculus
Articles containing proofs